The 2010–11 Moldovan National Division was the 20th season of top-tier football in Moldova. Sheriff Tiraspol were the defending champions having won their tenth Moldovan championship, all consecutively, last season. The competition began on 24 July 2010.

Teams
FC Costuleni and CF Gagauziya were promoted from the Moldovan "A" Division as champions and runners-up, respectively, to the National Division. None of the teams competing in the 2009–10 season were relegated, leaving 14 teams to contest the league, with one relegation place for the team finishing bottom.

Stadia and locations

Managers and captains

League table

Round by round

Results
The schedule consists of three rounds. During the first two rounds, each team plays each other once home and away for a total of 26 matches. The pairings of the third round will then be set according to the standings after the first two rounds, giving every team a third game against each opponent for a total of 39 games per team.

First and second round

Third round
Key numbers for pairing determination (number marks position after 26 games):

Top goalscorers 
Including matches played on 22 May 2011; Source: Soccerway

8 goals (4 players)

  Julius Adaramola (FC Olimpia Bălţi)
  Adrian Grigoruță (FC Milsami)
  Ademar Xavier (FC Milsami)
  Dmitri Vornişel (FC Tiraspol)

7 goals (2 players)

  Sergiu Gheorghiev (FC Sheriff Tiraspol)
  Eduard Tomaşcov (FC Costuleni)

6 goals (10 players)

  Wilfried Benjamin Balima (FC Sheriff Tiraspol)
  Aleksandr Yerokhin (FC Sheriff Tiraspol)
  Eugen Gorodeţchi (FC Iskra-Stal Rîbnița)
  Stanislav Luca (Rapid Ghidighici)
  Renat Murguleţ (FC Nistru Otaci)
  Gheorghe Nicologlo (FC Tiraspol)
  Eugen Sidorenco (FC Zimbru Chişinău)
  Andrei Tcaciuc (FC Olimpia)
  Mihai Ţurcan (FC Zimbru Chişinău)
  Sergiu Zacon (FC Tighina)

5 goals (16 players)

  Maxim Antoniuc (FC Zimbru Chişinău)
  Jymmy Dougllas França (FC Sheriff Tiraspol)
  Maxim Franțuz (Rapid Ghidighici)
  Davit Gamezardashvili (FC Dacia Chişinău)
  Alexandru Golban (FC Milsami)
  Jean-Robens Jerome (FC Olimpia)
  Giga Mamulashvili (FC Tiraspol)
  Maxim Mihaliov (FC Dacia Chişinău)
  Andrei Novicov (FC Iskra-Stal Rîbnița)
  Christopher Omoseibi (FC Tiraspol)
  Mihail Paseciniuc (FC Olimpia)
  Aleksandar Pešić (FC Sheriff Tiraspol)
  Aleksey Procopiev (FC Tighina)
  Oleg Şişchin (FC Zimbru Chişinău)
  Adrian Sosnovschi (FC Milsami)
  Claudiu Octavian Vâlcu (FC Nistru Otaci)

4 goals (13 players)

  Andrei Bugneac (Rapid Ghidighici)
  Adrian Caragea (FC Tiraspol)
  Anatol Cheptine (FC Sheriff Tiraspol)
  Valentin Furdui (FC Milsami)
  Sergiu Grițuc (FC Nistru Otaci)
  Oleg Hromţov (CF Gagauziya)
  Alexandru Maxim (Rapid Ghidighici)
  Petru Ojog (FC Sfîntul Gheorghe)
  Marcel Reşitca (FC Costuleni)
  Razak Salifu (FC Zimbru)
  Dalibor Volaš (FC Sheriff Tiraspol)
  Vladimir Volkov (FC Sheriff Tiraspol)
  Nail Zamaliyev (FC Sheriff Tiraspol)

3 goals (30 players)

  Igor Bridnea (FC Tiraspol)
  Andrei Burcovschi (FC Iskra-Stal Rîbnița)
  Denis Calincov (Rapid Ghidighici)
  Ion Demerji (FC Zimbru Chişinău)
  Caio Suguino (FC Milsami)
  Eugen Golubovschi (FC Tighina)
  Alexandru A. Grosu (Rapid Ghidighici)
  Eduard Hoderean (FC Tiraspol)
  Claudiu Ionescu (FC Milsami)
  Sergiu Jăpălău (Rapid Ghidighici)
  Dmytro Kryvyy (FC Sfîntul Gheorghe)
  Petru Leucă (FC Academia Chişinău)
  Igor Maliarenco (FC Nistru Otaci)
  Oleg Molla (FC Dacia Chişinău))
  Jude Ogada (FC Olimpia)
  Ghenadie Olexici (FC Milsami)
  Nicolae Orlovschi (FC Olimpia)
  Alexandr Paşcenco (Rapid Ghidighici)
  Veaceslav Posmac (FC Sfîntul Gheorghe)
  Vladimir Potlog (FC Academia Chişinău)
  Andrei Prepeliţă (FC Sfîntul Gheorghe)
  German Pyatnikov (FC Sfîntul Gheorghe)
  Alexandru Răilean (FC Sfîntul Gheorghe)
  Nicolae Rudac (FC Iskra-Stal Rîbnița)
  Eugen Slivca (FC Academia Chişinău)
  Oluwaunmi Somide (FC Olimpia)
  Marian Stoleru (CF Gagauziya)
  Eugen Ţiverenco (FC Tighina)
  Andrei Vrabie (FC Costuleni)
  Vitalii Yezhov (FC Tiraspol)

2 goals (39 players)

  Ilie Bălaşa (FC Zimbru Chişinău)
  Victor Berco (FC Zimbru Chişinău)
  Artem Bludnov (FC Academia Chişinău)
  Vladimir Branković (FC Sheriff Tiraspol)
  Vitalie Bulat (FC Iskra-Stal)
  Andrey Burdian (FC Zimbru Chişinău)
  Christian Camacho (FC Sfîntul Gheorghe)
  Adrian Caşcaval (FC Academia Chişinău)
  Denis Ciobanu (FC Tighina)
  Sergiu Ciuico (FC Costuleni)
  Valeriu Ciupercă (FC Academia Chişinău)
  Andrei Custurov (CF Gagauziya)
  Fred Nélson de Olivera (FC Tiraspol)
  Dumitru Dolgov (FC Nistru Otaci)
  Vladimir Dragovozov (FC Dacia Chişinău)
  Vasil Ghutchashvili (FC Zimbru Chişinău)
  Eugen Gorceac (FC Dacia Chişinău)
  Sergiu Gusacov (FC Olimpia)
  Serghei Epureanu (FC Nistru Otaci)
  Ruslan Kartoev (CF Gagauziya)
  Yuriy Komyagin (FC Zimbru Chişinău)
  Thomas Kourouma (FC Olimpia)
  Vitaly Ledenev (FC Dacia Chişinău)
  Andrei Marina (FC Academia Chişinău)
  Nurudeen Mohammed (FC Milsami)
  Alexandru Onica (FC Dacia Chişinău)
  Mihail Plătică (FC Sfîntul Gheorghe)
  Andrei Porfireanu (FC Iskra-Stal)
  Maxim Potîrniche (FC Academia Chişinău)
  Maxim Repinețchi (FC Olimpia)
  Marius Robert Roman (FC Milsami)
  Eric Sackey (FC Dacia Chişinău) 
  Miral Samardžić (FC Sheriff Tiraspol)
  Sandro Shugladze (FC Iskra-Stal)
  Vazha Tarkhnishvili (FC Sheriff Tiraspol)
  Alexandru Tcaciuc (FC Nistru Otaci)
  Andrei Verbeţchi (FC Tiraspol)
  Alexandru Zislis (CF Gagauziya)

1 goals (87 players)

  Miloš Adamović (FC Sheriff Tiraspol)
  Stanislav Agafonov (FC Tighina)
  Ion Arabadji (Rapid Ghidighici)
  Ruslan Barburoş (FC Costuleni)
  Titi Belle (FC Nistru Otaci)
  Iurii Bondarciuc (FC Tiraspol)
  Victor Bulat (FC Dacia Chişinău)
  Ştefan Burghiu (FC Nistru)
  Iulian Bursuc (FC Dacia Chişinău)
  Dumitru Chiriloae (FC Sfîntul Gheorghe)
  Sergiu Cojocari (FC Zimbru Chişinău)
  Baba Collins (FC Dacia Chişinău)
  Andrei Corneencov (FC Tiraspol)
  Andrian Cucovei (FC Milsami)
  Sergiu Cuznețov (FC Academia Chişinău)
  Alexandru Dedov (FC Dacia Chişinău)
  Sergiu Diulgher (FC Tiraspol)
  Alexei Dîzov (FC Tighina)
  Lucian Dobre (FC Iskra-Stal)
  Sergiu Dubac (FC Costuleni)
  Valerian Gârlă (FC Milsami)
  Alexandru S. Grosu (Rapid Ghidighici)
  Artem Khachaturov (FC Sheriff Tiraspol)
  Maxim Hovanschi (FC Olimpia)
  Petru Hvorosteanov (FC Zimbru Chişinău)
  Oleg Ichim (FC Tighina)
  Daniel Indoitu (FC Academia Chişinău)
  Maxim Iurcu (FC Sheriff Tiraspol)
  Ion Jardan (Rapid Ghidighici)
  Alexei Josan (FC Costuleni)
  Davit Kakulia (FC Sfîntul Gheorghe)
  Ghandy Kassanu (FC Sheriff Tiraspol)
  Evgeny Khorolskyy (FC Olimpia)
  Anton Kovalevsky (FC Zimbru Chişinău)
  Denis Kravtsov (FC Sfîntul Gheorghe)
  Igor Lambarschi (FC Academia Chişinău)
  Eugen Lavrinovici (FC Costuleni)
  Cătălin Lichioiu (FC Olimpia)
  Maksym Maksymenko (FC Tiraspol)
  Vitalie Manaliu (Rapid Ghidighici)
  Petru Marcov (CF Gagauziya)
  Andrei Martin (FC Sfîntul Gheorghe])
  Alexandru Maximov (Rapid Ghidighici)
  Nicolai Mincev (FC Iskra-Stal)
  Sergiu Mocanu (FC Costuleni)
  Ilie Mostovei (CF Gagauziya)
  Anton Munten (FC Zimbru Chişinău)
  Igor Nagirnyi (FC Tiraspol)
  Sergiu Namaşco (FC Dacia Chişinău)
  Aleksandr Nechayev (FC Dacia Chişinău)
  Andrei Negara (CF Gagauziya)
  Igor Negrescu (FC Dacia Chişinău)
  David Ogoazi (FC Olimpia)
  Jude Nonso Okoye (CF Gagauziya)
  Denis Orbu (FC Costuleni)
  Sergiu Paşcenco (FC Olimpia)
  Djibril Tamsir Paye (FC Tiraspol)
  Vitalie Plămădeală (FC Zimbru Chişinău)
  Sergiu Plătică (FC Sfîntul Gheorghe)
  Dumitru Popovici (FC Dacia Chişinău)
  Andrei Radiola (FC Tiraspol)
  Ionuţ Florin Radu (FC Nistru Otaci)
  Oleksyi Remezovskyi (FC Olimpia)
  Iurie Romaniuc (CF Gagauziya)
  Dorin Rotaru (FC Sfîntul Gheorghe)
  Vasile Rusu (Rapid Ghidighici)
  Denis Rusu (Rapid Ghidighici)
  Carlos Santana de la Vega (FC Olimpia)
  Andrei Secrieru (FC Zimbru Chişinău)
  Maxim Şoimu (FC Tiraspol)
  Tudor Starciuc (FC Costuleni)
  Petru Stîngă (FC Milsami)
  Alexandru Şveț (FC Tighina)
  Vladimir Ţăranu (FC Iskra-Stal)
  Valentin Ternavschi (FC Olimpia)
  Nicolae Titucenco (FC Tighina)
  Eugeniu Tocilin (FC Sfîntul Gheorghe)
  Alexandru Tofan (Rapid Ghidighici)
  Abu Tommy (FC Sheriff Tiraspol)
  Ousmane Traore (FC Milsami)
  Nicolae Triboi (FC Academia Chişinău)
  Victor Truhanov (FC Iskra-Stal)
  Giorgi Tukhashvili (FC Nistru Otaci)
  Viktor Uzbek (FC Iskra-Stal)
  Evgeniy Vishnyakov (FC Iskra-Stal)
  Vitalie Sidorov (FC Olimpia)
  Marko Đurović (FC Sheriff Tiraspol)

Hat-tricks

Clean sheets

Top Foreigns

Moldova vs Rest of World

Disciplinary
Final classification.

References

External links
 Official website 
 Divizia Nationala 

Moldovan Super Liga seasons
1
Moldova